The third series of British reality television series The Apprentice (UK) was broadcast in the UK on BBC One, from 28 March to 13 June 2007. Following favourable ratings, the BBC moved the programme onto its mainstream channel and thus to a much wider audience, with its companion discussion show The Apprentice: You're Fired! being reallocated to BBC Two as part of the move. For this series, Alan Sugar commented that its production would include "tougher tasks and better people" as a means of making the programme stand out from other shows like Big Brother.  Alongside the usual twelve episodes, the series also featured two specials – the first, titled "Beyond the Boardroom", was aired on 3 June prior to the eleventh episode; the second, titled "Why I Fired Them", was aired on 10 June prior to the broadcast of the series finale.

This series saw in a change in the show's format, allowing for sixteen candidates to take part in the third series, with Simon Ambrose becoming the overall winner. Excluding the specials, the series averaged around 5.62 million viewers during its broadcast. The third series saw Sugar face accusations of sexism from several groups that he later denied, alongside a complaint by a candidate who participated in the series over the treatment of himself and the others he worked with.

Series overview 
With viewing figures proving favourable since the programme's debut in 2005, the BBC decided that The Apprentice needed to be more accessible to a "mainstream" audience. In discussions between them and the production company, it was agreed that the show be relocated to BBC One, retaining it scheduling arrangements, while also requiring that its sister show, You're Fired, be moved over to BBC Two to make it also accessible to a wider audience. Work on the new series included Alan Sugar arranging for a more tougher set of challenges to be faced by participants, and recruiting a more varied collection of participants than had been seen in the previous series. Sugar believed that by doing this it would keep the show fresh, and thus avoid it becoming just another version of existing reality programmes at the time, such as Big Brother. An example of this was having mixed gender teams at the beginning of the process, albeit a male and female candidate switching places with each other, rather than at a later task in the process as is more common in the programme's format found in other series.

One of the biggest changes made by the production staff, besides the change of channel for episode broadcast, focused on an issue that Sugar raised in the previous series over firing candidates. With the show attracting a far greater number of applications for participation, resulting in staff conducting interviews, auditions and assessments on over 10,000 applicants, the decision was made to increase the number of candidates that formed up the final line-up while still maintaining the use of twelve episodes for the series, thus allowing Sugar to fire more than one candidate at any time before the Interviews stage. When production began, 16 applicants found themselves taking part in the third series, in which the first task saw the men form under the team name of Stealth, while the women formed under the team name of Eclipse. It is the first series to feature a candidate leaving the process despite having won a place into the next stage – the decision by Katie Hopkins to depart towards the end of the Interviews stage, garnered considerable criticism over sexual discrimination in the aftermath of the episode's broadcast.

Of those who took part, Simon Ambrose would become the eventual winner of the series, and go on to work at Sugar's property company Amsprop, overseeing development projects, before leaving Sugar's employment in 2010 to focus on setting up in the restaurant business. The move to BBC One proved to be a reasonable decision, as it led to a further improvement in viewing figures for the programme during its broadcast – by the end of the series, The Apprentice reached a peak of 6.8 million viewers watching the series finale.

Candidates

Performance chart 

Key:
 The candidate won this series of The Apprentice.
 The candidate was the runner-up.
 The candidate won as project manager on his/her team, for this task.
 The candidate lost as project manager on his/her team, for this task.
 The candidate was on the winning team for this task / they passed the Interviews stage.
 The candidate was on the losing team for this task.
 The candidate was brought to the final boardroom for this task.
 The candidate was fired in this task.
 The candidate lost as project manager for this task and was fired.
 The candidate left the competition on this task.

Episodes

Criticism 
 Sexual discrimination accusation

Towards the end of the third series, several organisation - including the Trades Union Congress, the Liberal Democrats, The Equal Opportunities Commission and the Recruitment and Employment Confederation - criticised Alan Sugar for conducting sexual discrimination on a televised programme. The accusations were centred around the boardroom segment for the eleventh episode, in regards to the questioning of two of the remaining five candidates in the contest, Katie Hopkins and Kristina Grimes, about their child-care arrangements, but not Tre Azam, with the groups accusing Sugar of being in breach of the 1976 Sex Discrimination act. However, Sugar denied the allegations of sexism due to his knowledge of the government act, a point that was strongly supported by facts that had not been taken into consideration before the accusation was made.

The primary factor that the groups did not know of, was that both Hopkins and Grimes had been asked about child-care, because both had disclosed information in their applications before appearing on the programme that each was a single mother at the time; Tre Azam was not asked the same question, because he had made clear in his application that, while he was a father, he was also married. In addition, Hopkins decision to decline an offer to proceed into the final had been purely her decision, and not influenced by anyone else or her status as a single mother.

Ratings 
Official episode viewing figures are from BARB.

Specials

References

External links 

 

2007 British television seasons
03